{{Infobox radio station
| logo               = WRKT Rocket105 logo.png
| name               = WRKT
| city               = North East, Pennsylvania
| area               = Erie, Pennsylvania
| branding           = Rocket 105
| frequency          = 
| airdate            =  (at 100.9)
| format             = Active Rock
| erp                = 4,500 watts
| haat               = 
| class              = B1
| facility_id        = 55063
| coordinates        =
| callsign_meaning   = W'RocKeT| former_callsigns   =
| former_frequencies =  (1989–2017)
| owner              = iHeartMedia, Inc.
| licensee           = iHM Licenses, LLC
| sister_stations    = WFNN, WJET, WRTS, WEBG, WTWF, WXBB
| webcast            = 
| website            = rocketerie.iheart.com
}}WRKT''' (104.9 FM, "Rocket 105") is an active rock radio station in Erie, Pennsylvania. The station is owned by iHeartMedia. WRKT's studios are located in the Boston Store building in downtown Erie while its transmitter is located near NE Sherman Road and Miller Road in Chautauqua County, New York. It plays both old, new, and next rock songs plus an array of sports.

History
The final song as "Rocket 101" was "Free Bird" by Lynyrd Skynyrd, while the first song as "Rocket 105" was "For Those About to Rock (We Salute You)" by AC/DC. The 100.9 frequency was to be reallocated to Westfield, New York, and sold at auction. Rick Rambaldo, owner of WEHP, won the bid, but was late in getting his down payment sent to the FCC, leading to rejection of his bid. The frequency again went up for auction in April 2020 (later delayed to July 2021). Rambaldo held an agreement to restore the oldies format that had previously been on WZTE until 2017 had he won the auction. Rambaldo sold WEHP in 2019, but re-entered the 2021 auction, winning the bidding for the 100.9 license. In 2022, Family Life Network claimed that it had acquired the frequency and relocated the 100.9 allocation back to North East as WCGE.

On March 27, 2019, Connoisseur Media announced that it would transfer WRKT, along with its sister stations in Erie, to iHeartMedia in exchange for WFRE and WFMD in the Frederick, Maryland, market from the Aloha Station Trust. The sale closed on May 20, 2019. Since this time, the only remaining local air personalities on the station are Mojo McKay and Allan Carpenter. The remainder of Rocket 105's programming originates from the iHeartMedia Premium Choice lineup.

Notable past and present on-air personalities include Kris Earl Phillips, the original Program Director and architect of the "Rocket" format, Steve Bohen, Paul Spinley, Kevin August, Dave Sharp, Amy St. John, Ronnie "Ron Klinester" Kline, Mark O'Brien, Nat Massing, Mojo McKay, Allan "AC" Carpenter, Woody, with Chris Rodler, and "Static 'Stat' Boy".

References

External links
 WRKT official website
 

RKT
IHeartMedia radio stations
Active rock radio stations in the United States